Celiny may refer to the following places:
Celiny, Lesser Poland Voivodeship (south Poland)
Celiny, Lublin Voivodeship (east Poland)
Celiny, Gmina Bodzentyn in Świętokrzyskie Voivodeship (south-central Poland)
Celiny, Gmina Chmielnik in Świętokrzyskie Voivodeship (south-central Poland)
Celiny, Gmina Raków in Świętokrzyskie Voivodeship (south-central Poland)
Celiny, Włoszczowa County in Świętokrzyskie Voivodeship (south-central Poland)
Celiny, Częstochowa County in Silesian Voivodeship (south Poland)
Celiny, Tarnowskie Góry County in Silesian Voivodeship (south Poland)